Season of the Witch may refer to:

Music
"Season of the Witch" (song), by Donovan, 1966
"Season of the Witch", a song by American hard rock band Zeke
Seasons of the Witch, a 2003 album by Gotham Road
Season of the Witch (John 5 album), 2017
Season of the Witch (Nox Arcana album), 2017

Films
Season of the Witch (1973 film), a film directed by George A. Romero
Season of the Witch (2011 film), a supernatural film starring Nicolas Cage
Halloween III: Season of the Witch, a 1982 horror film

Books
Season of the Witch, a 1968 science fiction novel by Hank Stine
The Season of the Witch, a 1971 novel by James Leo Herlihy
Season of the Witch: Enchantment, Terror, and Deliverance in the City of Love, a 2012 non-fiction book by David Talbot 
Season of the Witch: How the Occult Saved Rock and Roll, a 2014 non-fiction book by Peter Bebergal
Season of the Witch (The Chilling Adventures of Sabrina, Book 1), a forthcoming 2019 novel by Sarah Rees Brennan